Andrews is a former suburb of the City of Gold Coast, Queensland, Australia.

History
Andrews was created as a suburb in 1981 and named after a family who owned a large amount of the land in the area. In 2002, Andrews was merged with Stephens and a portion of Robina, to form the new suburb of Varsity Lakes and the West Burleigh part of Burleigh Heads. Andrews is no longer an official placename.

See also
Suburbs of the Gold Coast

References

External links
 University of Queensland: Queensland Places: Andrews

Suburbs of the Gold Coast, Queensland
Varsity Lakes, Queensland